In Andean Iconography front-facing figures are often referred to as Staff Gods and thought to represent deities in Andean cultures. There is no uniform representation of a "Staff God". Dozens of variations of "Staff Gods" exist. Usually a Staff God is pictured "front-facing" holding vertical objects (referred to as "staffs") one in each hand. Some scholars think that some variations of the Staff God are possible depictions of Viracocha or Thunupa.

The oldest known depiction of the Staff God was found in 2003 on some broken gourd fragments in a burial site in the Pativilca River Valley (Norte Chico region) and carbon dated to 2250 BCE. This makes it the oldest image of a god to be found in the Americas.

There are scholars who maintain that the Wari-Tiwanaku Staff God is the forerunner of the Incan principal gods, Sun, Moon, and Thunder. As the chief deity, it was considered the creator god and served as the primary religious icon of the entire Peruvian Andes, particularly during the Early Horizon (900-200 BC) and beyond. The worship of Staff Gods spread to the Central Andes during the Middle Horizon (600-1000 CE) This is supported by excavated Middle Horizon artifacts that resembled the Staff-God.

Representations and iconography 
The staff god was a basic iconography shared by the cultures of pre-Columbian Peru, particularly those occupying the northern coast and the southern highlands. This is seen in the stylistic uniformity of the icons and representations, which suggested widespread adherence. 

There were varying depictions of the Staff-God among these Andean cultures. However, it was often portrayed as a deity in apotheosis, with hands always holding instruments of power. For instance, an artifact found at Chavin de Huantar showed the deity holding a Spondylus and Strombus shells, which were female and male symbols, respectively. This representation indicated how the Staff-God wielded authority to maintain social harmony and the Andean ideal of gender complementarity.  Another  Early Horizon sculpted stone, the Raimondi Stele, is perhaps the most popular representation and depicted the Staff-God as a sky or lightning god plunging down to earth.

Representations of the southern highland staff god did not only carry motifs but were also presented with accompanying consorts in the form of deities painted on textiles used to decorate temple walls or ceramic vessels. 

The Staff God has one of the most important iconographical elements in central Andean archaeology and this is prominent in both portable and fixed art using different media such as stone, textile, and ceramic. A form of the staff god, for example, takes a central role in the Sun Gate of the Tiwanaku culture, a single-stone monolith. Tunics and ceramics from both the Tiwanaku and Wari cultures of the Middle Horizon period showcase a similar god. Another example is the giant offering jars found at Qunchupata. They were painted with the Staff-God's image, one that bears resemblance to the god's depiction at the back of the Tiwanaku's Ponce Monolith.

See also
Norte Chico civilization
Wiracocha

Notes

External links
 New Scientist article on the find in Patavilca
 Archaeology magazine article, with photo and illustration of the Staff God

Inca gods
Norte Chico civilization